In each year's Chinese New Year celebrations in Hong Kong, a member of the Hong Kong Government represents the city in a divination ritual called kau chim. The event takes place on the second day of the Lunar New Year at Che Kung temple, Sha Tin, where a fortune stick is drawn.  The luck of the city for that upcoming Lunar year will be foretold by the message on the fortune stick.  The message is written in the form of classical Chinese poetry and is then interpreted by a Feng shui sifu or fortune teller.

Tradition
Usually one stick is drawn for the fortune of the city by a main representative person.  Other sticks may be drawn for smaller community divinations.  There are five categories of stick fortunes, from good (上), to mid (中), to bad (下).  Each level also has internal degrees.  For example, stick #27 is unlucky.  It relates to the story of Qin Shi Huang, first emperor of the Qin dynasty, who built the Great Wall of China and sparked widespread opposition among his people.

Results

See also
 Chinese spiritual world concepts
 Dajiao
 Jiaobei
 Tai Sui
 Timeline of Hong Kong history
 Tung Shing

References

Culture of Hong Kong
Chinese culture
Divination